Vimont is a district in the centre of Laval, Quebec. It was a separate city until the municipal mergers on August 6, 1965.
Until 1960 the name was Saint-Elzéar.

Geography
Vimont is delimited north-west by Sainte-Rose, north-east by Auteuil, east by Duvernay, south-west by Chomedey and south-east by Pont-Viau.

Features
The Cité de la Santé de Laval, Laval's main hospital is located in Vimont, as is the Vimont Commuter Train station. Vimont has one hockey arena in the area, the Lucerne arena. Vimont is part of the Monteuil sports association along with Auteuil.

Education
Commission scolaire de Laval operates Francophone public schools.
 École primaire Les Explorateurs
 École primaire Le Sentier
 École primaire Paul-Comtois
 École primaire Père-Vimont

Sir Wilfrid Laurier School Board operates Anglophone public schools. Elementary schools serving Vimont include:
 St. Paul Elementary School in Duvernay
  it has about 430 students.
 Terry Fox Elementary School in Auteuil
 The school's previous campus was in Vimont. On September 20, 1993 the current campus in Auteuil opened. By 2013 the campus was at 113% capacity.
All portions of Laval are zoned to Laval Junior Academy and Laval Senior Academy

References

External links
City of Laval, official website

Neighbourhoods in Laval, Quebec
Former municipalities in Quebec
Populated places disestablished in 1965